Center Island Airport  is a private use airport located on Center Island, in San Juan County, Washington, United States. The airport is owned by the Center Island Association. It was included in the National Plan of Integrated Airport Systems for 2011–2015, which categorized it as a general aviation facility.

Center Island Airport is a "turf-gravel" runway approximately 1600 feet long by 100 feet wide.

References

External links 
 
 Aerial image as of June 1990 from USGS The National Map DEAD LINK
  RETURNS "NO RESULTS FOUND"

Airports in Washington (state)
Airports in San Juan County, Washington